American actress Shailene Woodley has received several awards and nominations for her acting. These include nominations for a British Academy Film Award, a Primetime Emmy Award, two Golden Globe Awards, two Screen Actors Guild Awards, and four Critics' Choice Movie Awards.

Major Associations

British Academy Film Awards

Critics' Choice Movie Awards

Golden Globe Awards

Primetime Emmy Awards

Screen Actors Guild Awards

Industry awards

Gotham Awards

Independent Spirit Awards

MTV Movie Awards

MTV Video Music Awards

People's Choice Awards

Teen Choice Awards

Film critic associations

Miscellaneous awards

References

Woodley, Shailene